The Arts & Entertainment District, or previously known as Omni, is a neighborhood of Downtown Miami, Florida. It is bound roughly by North 19th Street to the north, North 10th Street to the south, North East 2nd Avenue to the west, and Biscayne Boulevard to the east.

The Arts & Entertainment District is an urban, residential neighborhood with many high-rise residential towers, as well as some smaller scale historic buildings. It is home to the Adrienne Arsht Center for the Performing Arts, the old Miami Herald headquarters (now located in Doral), and the Omni International Mall.  Until 2014, it was one of the neighborhoods that hosted the annual Miami International Boat Show at the Sea Isle Marina. The City of Miami Cemetery, one of Miami's oldest cemeteries, is also located in the district, as well as the historic Women's Club, and some of Miami's oldest churches and synagogues.

The Arts & Entertainment District is served by the Omni Loop branch of the Metromover and by the Metrorail via Metromover at Government Center.

History
From the 1920s to the 1950s, the Omni area was a high-end shopping area with many major department stores along Biscayne Boulevard, such as Sears, Roebuck and Company (whose tower still stands at the Arsht Center), Jordan Marsh (NE 15th Street and Biscayne Blvd) built in 1956, and a Burdines (NE 14th Street and Biscayne Blvd). By 1930, this area of Biscayne Boulevard was the home of Sears (later Burdines) Store, and the Shrine Building (which still stands at NE 14th Street and Biscayne  Blvd), all of which were designed and built by the Biscayne Boulevard Company in the Art Deco architectural style. The area from NE 13th to NE 16th Street was envisioned as a high-end shopping district.  By 1930, early tenants in the Shrine Building included the Piggly-Wiggly grocery store, Biscayne-Page Electric Company, and the John Turner Piano Store on the first floor. Other tenants in 1930 were the Home Drug Store and the Burroughs Adding Machine Company.

In 1977, the Omni International Mall opened replacing much of the street-side stores with a suburban-style shopping mall. The mall brought many upscale stores to the Omni such as Emilio Pucci, Givenchy, and Hermes. By the 1990s, however, the mall began to falter, and in 1991, Jordan Marsh closed, and in 1998, so did JC Penney. In 2000, the mall closed, and the area was reconverted into offices in 2007. Today, it houses a few office tenants and the Miami International University of Art and Design. It is also the corporate home of the Greater Miami Chamber of Commerce. The name of the neighborhood today, comes from the name of the Omni Mall.

In the 2000s, rapid construction of high-rise residential skyscrapers has revitalized the neighborhood from urban blight. The area around Margaret Pace Park has seen large population growth from 2000 to 2010. Omni today has a large residential population, and with continued retail and residential construction in the neighborhood, has grown into its own unique neighborhood in the city.

Education
Miami-Dade County Public Schools
Miami International University of Art and Design, private college
Aspira of Florida Charter School, public charter school

Transportation

Metromover train system runs three lines throughout Downtown (the Downtown Loop, the Omni Loop, and the Brickell Loop). The Metromover connects with Metrorail and is free. There are two Metromover stations in the district- School Board Station and Adrienne Arsht Center. Transfers can be made to the Metrorail, Miami's heavy rail system, at Government Center, as well as to the Brickell and Inner Metromover loops. Metrorail has stops throughout Miami with connections to Miami International Airport, all Miami-Dade County bus lines, Tri-Rail, and Amtrak. The main bus station is also located in the district, next to the Arsht Center at the Adrienne Arsht Center station.

The Arts & Entertainment District is served by Metrobus throughout the area, the Miami Metrorail, and the Metromover:

Metrorail:
  Government Center (NW First Street and First Avenue)

Metromover:
 Omni Loop

As an urban and pedestrian-friendly area with an extensive public transit network, the Arts & Entertainment District and the greater Downtown area, is one of the areas in Miami where a car-free lifestyle is commonplace. Many residents get around by foot, bicycle, Metromover or by taxi. The Metromover is a popular alternative to walking in the area, especially on rainy, hot or cold days, as the Metromover is free, and stations are located roughly every two blocks throughout the area.

Recently, the City of Miami, along with the Downtown Development Authority, has begun bicycle initiates promoting citywide bike parking and bike lanes, that have made bicycling much more popular for residents. Bike lanes and bike sharrows are currently planned for the majority of Downtown streets to be painted by the end of 2010. The Venetian Causeway is a popular bicycle commuter route that connects South Beach to Omni. The Rickenbacker Causeway is very popular on weekends for recreational bicyclists, and often, bicycles can outnumber cars on the causeway.

Parks
Margaret Pace Park
City of Miami Cemetery

Historic Omni

Although one of Miami's oldest neighborhoods, few buildings remain in the district from its founding days. Some historic buildings in the area include:

Points of interest

Adrienne Arsht Center for the Performing Arts
Sea Isle Marina
Omni International Mall

Miami Herald
The Grand Doubletree
Opera Tower

Gallery

References

Neighborhoods in Miami
Shopping districts and streets in the United States
Entertainment districts in Florida
Tourist attractions in Miami
Arts districts